Jean-Luc Mamadou Diarra Dompé (born 12 August 1995) is a French professional footballer who plays as a winger for German  club Hamburger SV.

Club career
Dompé spent the early years of his career at French side Valenciennes. He began playing with the club's reserves team in the CFA 1 and CFA 2 where he made 27 appearances and scored 3 goals. He spent three seasons with the B-team before making the step up to the first-team squad under Bernard Casoni. He played 21 times for the Valenciennes first-team before leaving in June 2015.

In June 2015, Dompé left France to go to Belgium in order to join newly promoted Pro League club Sint-Truiden on a three-year contract. He made 14 appearances and scored two goals in all competitions for the Limburg based club before leaving in January 2016 to join Standard Liège where he signed a contract until 2019. At Standard Liège he scored as they won the 2016 Belgian Cup Final.

Dompé signed on loan to Eupen from Standard Liège in February 2017.

On 18 August 2022, Dompé signed a three-year contract with Hamburger SV in Germany.

International career
Dompé is of Malian descent. He is a youth international for France.

Career statistics

Honours
Dompé first professional honour was with the France U20s as the side won the 2015 Toulon Tournament.

Club
Standard Liège
Belgian Cup: 2015–16

France U20s
Toulon Tournament: 2015

References

External links
 
 
 
 

1995 births
People from Arpajon
Footballers from Essonne
Living people
Association football wingers
French footballers
France youth international footballers
French people of Malian descent
LB Châteauroux players
Évry FC players
Valenciennes FC players
Sint-Truidense V.V. players
Standard Liège players
Amiens SC players
K.A.A. Gent players
S.V. Zulte Waregem players
Hamburger SV players
Ligue 1 players
Ligue 2 players
Belgian Pro League players
French expatriate footballers
French expatriate sportspeople in Belgium
Expatriate footballers in Belgium
French expatriate sportspeople in Germany
Expatriate footballers in Germany